Longoria is a Spanish surname. The surname “Longoria” is originated in the province of Asturias in northwestern Spain, is found in the basque region of Spain and also in Italy.

People
Notable people with the surname include:
Álvaro Longoria, Spanish director
David Longoria, American trumpeter
Eva Longoria, American actress
Evan Longoria, American baseball player
Felix Z. Longoria Jr., American soldier
Sam Longoria, American filmmaker
Paola Longoria, Mexican athlete

See also
Llongoria or Longoria, village in Belmonte de Miranda, Asturias, Spain
The Palace of Longoria, (Spanish: Palacio Longoria) palace located in Madrid, Spain

References